Salyers is a surname. Notable people with the surname include:

Abigail A. Salyers (1942–2013), microbiologist
Marc Salyers (born 1979), American basketball player
Vincent Salyers, American professor of nursing
William Salyers (born 1964), American actor

See also
Salyer (disambiguation)